Harpalus franzi is a species of ground beetle in the subfamily Harpalinae. It was described by Mateu in 1954.

References

franzi
Beetles described in 1954